Further Tales of the City (1982) is the third book in the Tales of the City series by San Francisco novelist Armistead Maupin, originally serialized in the San Francisco Chronicle. It was adapted into the 2001 miniseries Further Tales of the City.

This novel takes place in 1981 during the first year of the Reagan Administration and imagines that the real-life figure of Jim Jones survives the Jonestown massacre. The book also captures the tail end of the post-Stonewall, pre-AIDS era of decadence in the gay culture of the early 1980s as the Michael Tolliver character explores his promiscuous side after breaking up with Jon Fielding.

References

1982 American novels
1980s LGBT novels
Novels by Armistead Maupin
Tales of the City
Fiction set in 1981
Novels first published in serial form
Works originally published in the San Francisco Chronicle
Novels set in San Francisco
Harper & Row books
American novels adapted into television shows
Novels set in the 1980s